Richard Aylmer may refer to:
 Richard Aylmer (skier) (1932–2023), British cross-country skier
 Richard Aylmer (politician) (died 1512), English politician